André Brulé (4 February 1922 – 3 March 2015) was a French racing cyclist. He rode in the 1948 and 1949 Tour de France.

References

External links
 

1922 births
2015 deaths
French male cyclists
Sportspeople from Eure-et-Loir
Cyclists from Centre-Val de Loire
Tour de Suisse stage winners